Hieu Van Le,  (born 1 January 1954) was the 35th governor of South Australia, in office from 1 September 2014 to 31 August 2021. He served as the state's lieutenant-governor from 2007 to 2014. He also served as chair of the South Australian Multicultural and Ethnic Affairs Commission (SAMEAC) from 2006 to 2009. Le is the first person of Asian heritage to be appointed a state governor in Australia, and first person of Vietnamese background to be appointed to a vice-regal position anywhere in the world.

Early life
Le was born in Quảng Trị, South Vietnam, on 1 January 1954. He was raised and educated in Đà Nẵng, and attended Dalat University. In November 1977, he fled the new communist regime in Vietnam and arrived by boat in Darwin, Northern Territory, as a refugee, with his wife Lan and about 40 other people. Their two sons were born in Australia and are named after Australian cricketers Sir Donald Bradman and Kim Hughes.

Career
After arriving in Australia, Le attended the University of Adelaide, receiving a Master of Business Administration and an Economics degree. He was a senior investigator and manager with the Australian Securities and Investments Commission from the early 1990s until his retirement in 2009. He is also a member of the Australian Society of Certified Practising Accountants (CPA) and a Fellow Member of the Financial Services Institute of Australasia (Finsia).

Governor
Le's appointment as Governor of South Australia to replace Kevin Scarce was announced on 26 June 2014; he took office on 1 September, with Scarce's term expiring on 7 August. Le is a Catholic and credits his experiences as a refugee for strengthening his religious convictions. In June 2019, Premier Steven Marshall announced that Le's original term as governor had been extended by two years, to 31 August 2021.

Honours

Orders
  2010: Officer of the Order of Australia (AO)
  2014: Knight of Grace of the Order of St John
  2016: Companion of the Order of Australia (AC)

Medals
  2001: Centenary Medal "for service to the advancement of multiculturalism in Australia",

Appointments
  2014: Colonel of the Royal South Australia Regiment.
  2014: Deputy Prior of the Order of St John.

References

External links

 His Excellency the Honourable Hieu Van Le AO at Government House SA
 Bio Hieu Van Le at the South Australian Multicultural and Ethnic Affairs Commission (SAMEAC)
 From refugee to Lieutenant Governor
 Stateline Interview at ABC

1954 births
Living people
Australian accountants
Australian economists
Australian Roman Catholics
Lieutenant-Governors of South Australia
Governors of South Australia
People from Quảng Trị province
Recipients of the Centenary Medal
University of Adelaide alumni
Vietnamese emigrants to Australia
Vietnamese refugees
Companions of the Order of Australia